The Bo’ness and Kinneil Railway is a heritage railway in Bo'ness, Scotland. Bo'ness railway station is the nucleus of the Museum of Scottish Railways.

Stations 
The railway has three main stations and small halt:
 Bo'ness railway station at Bo'ness (i.e. Borrowstounness)
 Kinneil Halt (Request stop)
 Birkhill railway station
 Manuel Junction

See also 

 List of British heritage and private railways
 List of closed railway lines in Great Britain

External links 

 The Railway website
 The Collection website
 The Diesel Group website
 The Steam Group website

Heritage railways in Scotland
Transport in Falkirk (council area)
Bo'ness
Tourist attractions in Falkirk (council area)
Standard gauge railways in Scotland
1979 establishments in Scotland
Railway lines opened in 1979